The 2008 Associates Tri-Series in Kenya is a One Day International cricket tournament which was held in Kenya from October 17 to October 25, 2008. The tri-series involves the national teams of Ireland, Kenya and Zimbabwe.

Group stage

Points table

Matches

Final

References

Associates Tri-series In Kenya, 2008
International cricket competitions in 2008
2008 in Kenyan cricket